MATLAB (an abbreviation of "MATrix LABoratory") is a proprietary multi-paradigm programming language and numeric computing environment developed by MathWorks. MATLAB allows matrix manipulations, plotting of functions and data, implementation of algorithms, creation of user interfaces, and interfacing with programs written in other languages.

Although MATLAB is intended primarily for numeric computing, an optional toolbox uses the MuPAD symbolic engine allowing access to symbolic computing abilities. An additional package, Simulink, adds graphical multi-domain simulation and model-based design for dynamic and embedded systems.

As of 2020, MATLAB has more than 4 million users worldwide. They come from various backgrounds of engineering, science, and economics.

History

Origins
MATLAB was invented by mathematician and computer programmer Cleve Moler. The idea for MATLAB was based on his 1960s PhD thesis. Moler became a math professor at the University of New Mexico and started developing MATLAB for his students as a hobby. He developed MATLAB's initial linear algebra programming in 1967 with his one-time thesis advisor, George Forsythe. This was followed by Fortran code for linear equations in 1971. 

In the beginning (before version 1.0) MATLAB "was not a programming language; it was a simple interactive matrix calculator. There were no programs, no toolboxes, no graphics. And no ODEs or FFTs."

The first early version of MATLAB was completed in the late 1970s. The software was disclosed to the public for the first time in February 1979 at the Naval Postgraduate School in California. Early versions of MATLAB were simple matrix calculators with 71 pre-built functions. At the time, MATLAB was distributed for free to universities. Moler would leave copies at universities he visited and the software developed a strong following in the math departments of university campuses.

In the 1980s, Cleve Moler met John N. Little. They decided to reprogram MATLAB in C and market it for the IBM desktops that were replacing mainframe computers at the time. John Little and programmer Steve Bangert re-programmed MATLAB in C, created the MATLAB programming language, and developed features for toolboxes.

Commercial development
MATLAB was first released as a commercial product in 1984 at the Automatic Control Conference in Las Vegas. MathWorks, Inc. was founded to develop the software and the MATLAB programming language was released. The first MATLAB sale was the following year, when Nick Trefethen from the Massachusetts Institute of Technology bought ten copies. 

By the end of the 1980s, several hundred copies of MATLAB had been sold to universities for student use. The software was popularized largely thanks to toolboxes created by experts in various fields for performing specialized mathematical tasks. Many of the toolboxes were developed as a result of Stanford students that used MATLAB in academia, then brought the software with them to the private sector.

Over time, MATLAB was re-written for early operating systems created by Digital Equipment Corporation, VAX,  Sun Microsystems, and for Unix PCs. Version 3 was released in 1987. The first MATLAB compiler was developed by Stephen C. Johnson in the 1990s.

In 2000, MathWorks added a Fortran-based library for linear algebra in MATLAB 6, replacing the software's original LINPACK and EISPACK subroutines that were in C. MATLAB's Parallel Computing Toolbox was released at the 2004 Supercomputing Conference and support for graphics processing units (GPUs) was added to it in 2010.

Recent history
Some especially large changes to the software were made with version 8 in 2012. The user interface was reworked and Simulink's functionality was expanded. By 2016, MATLAB had introduced several technical and user interface improvements, including the MATLAB Live Editor notebook, and other features.

Syntax
The MATLAB application is built around the MATLAB programming language. Common usage of the MATLAB application involves using the "Command Window" as an interactive mathematical shell or executing text files containing MATLAB code.

Variables
Variables are defined using the assignment operator, =. MATLAB is a weakly typed programming language because types are implicitly converted.  It is an inferred typed language because variables can be assigned without declaring their type, except if they are to be treated as symbolic objects, and that their type can change. Values can come from constants, from computation involving values of other variables, or from the output of a function. For example:
>> x = 17
x =
 17

>> x = 'hat'
x =
hat

>> x = [3*4, pi/2]
x =
   12.0000    1.5708

>> y = 3*sin(x)
y =
   -1.6097    3.0000

Vectors and matrices 
A simple array is defined using the colon syntax: initial:increment:terminator. For instance:
>> array = 1:2:9
array =
 1 3 5 7 9
defines a variable named array (or assigns a new value to an existing variable with the name array) which is an array consisting of the values 1, 3, 5, 7, and 9. That is, the array starts at 1 (the initial value), increments with each step from the previous value by 2 (the increment value), and stops once it reaches (or is about to exceed) 9 (the terminator value).

The increment value can actually be left out of this syntax (along with one of the colons), to use a default value of 1.
>> ari = 1:5
ari =
 1 2 3 4 5
assigns to the variable named ari an array with the values 1, 2, 3, 4, and 5, since the default value of 1 is used as the increment.

Indexing is one-based, which is the usual convention for matrices in mathematics, unlike zero-based indexing commonly used in other programming languages such as C, C++, and Java.

Matrices can be defined by separating the elements of a row with blank space or comma and using a semicolon to separate the rows. The list of elements should be surrounded by square brackets []. Parentheses are used to access elements and subarrays (they are also used to denote a function argument list).

>> A = [16, 3, 2, 13  ; 5, 10, 11, 8 ; 9, 6, 7, 12 ; 4, 15, 14, 1]
A =
 16  3  2 13
  5 10 11  8
  9  6  7 12
  4 15 14  1

>> A(2,3)
ans =
 11

Sets of indices can be specified by expressions such as 2:4, which evaluates to [2, 3, 4].  For example, a submatrix taken from rows 2 through 4 and columns 3 through 4 can be written as:
>> A(2:4,3:4)
ans =
 11 8
 7 12
 14 1
A square identity matrix of size n can be generated using the function eye, and matrices of any size with zeros or ones can be generated with the functions zeros and ones, respectively.
>> eye(3,3)
ans =
 1 0 0
 0 1 0
 0 0 1

>> zeros(2,3)
ans =
 0 0 0
 0 0 0

>> ones(2,3)
ans =
 1 1 1
 1 1 1

Transposing a vector or a matrix is done either by the function transpose or by adding dot-prime after the matrix (without the dot, prime will perform conjugate transpose for complex arrays):
>> A = [1 ; 2],  B = A.', C = transpose(A)
A =
     1
     2
B =
     1     2
C =
     1     2

>> D = [0, 3 ; 1, 5], D.'
D =
     0     3
     1     5
ans =
     0     1
     3     5

Most functions accept arrays as input and operate element-wise on each element. For example, mod(2*J,n) will multiply every element in J by 2, and then reduce each element modulo n. MATLAB does include standard for and while loops, but (as in other similar applications such as R), using the vectorized notation is encouraged and is often faster to execute. The following code, excerpted from the function magic.m, creates a magic square M for odd values of n (MATLAB function meshgrid is used here to generate square matrices I and J containing 1:n):

[J,I] = meshgrid(1:n);
A = mod(I + J - (n + 3) / 2, n);
B = mod(I + 2 * J - 2, n);
M = n * A + B + 1;

Structures 
MATLAB supports structure data types. Since all variables in MATLAB are arrays, a more adequate name is "structure array", where each element of the array has the same field names. In addition, MATLAB supports dynamic field names (field look-ups by name, field manipulations, etc.).

Functions 
When creating a MATLAB function, the name of the file should match the name of the first function in the file. Valid function names begin with an alphabetic character, and can contain letters, numbers, or underscores.  Variables and functions are case sensitive.

Function handles 
MATLAB supports elements of lambda calculus by introducing function handles, or function references, which are implemented either in .m files or anonymous/nested functions.

Classes and object-oriented programming 
MATLAB supports object-oriented programming including classes, inheritance, virtual dispatch, packages, pass-by-value semantics, and pass-by-reference semantics. However, the syntax and calling conventions are significantly different from other languages. MATLAB has value classes and reference classes, depending on whether the class has handle as a super-class (for reference classes) or not (for value classes).

Method call behavior is different between value and reference classes. For example, a call to a method:
object.method();
can alter any member of object only if object is an instance of a reference class, otherwise value class methods must return a new instance if it needs to modify the object.

An example of a simple class is provided below:

classdef Hello
    methods
        function greet(obj)
            disp('Hello!')
        end
    end
end

When put into a file named hello.m, this can be executed with the following commands:
>> x = Hello();
>> x.greet();
Hello!

Graphics and graphical user interface programming 

MATLAB has tightly integrated graph-plotting features. For example, the function plot can be used to produce a graph from two vectors x and y. The code:
x = 0:pi/100:2*pi;
y = sin(x);
plot(x,y)
produces the following figure of the sine function:

MATLAB supports three-dimensional graphics as well:

MATLAB supports developing graphical user interface (GUI) applications. UIs can be generated either programmatically or using visual design environments such as GUIDE and App Designer.

MATLAB and other languages 
MATLAB can call functions and subroutines written in the programming languages C or Fortran. A wrapper function is created allowing MATLAB data types to be passed and returned. MEX files (MATLAB executables) are the dynamically loadable object files created by compiling such functions. Since 2014 increasing two-way interfacing with Python was being added.

Libraries written in Perl, Java, ActiveX or .NET can be directly called from MATLAB, and many MATLAB libraries (for example XML or SQL support) are implemented as wrappers around Java or ActiveX libraries. Calling MATLAB from Java is more complicated, but can be done with a MATLAB toolbox which is sold separately by MathWorks, or using an undocumented mechanism called JMI (Java-to-MATLAB  Interface), (which should not be confused with the unrelated Java Metadata Interface that is also called JMI). Official MATLAB API for Java was added in 2016.

As alternatives to the MuPAD based Symbolic Math Toolbox available from MathWorks, MATLAB can be connected to Maple or Mathematica.

Libraries also exist to import and export MathML.

Relations to US sanctions
In 2020, MATLAB withdrew services from two Chinese universities as a result of US sanctions.  The universities said this will be responded to by increased use of open-source alternatives and by developing domestic alternatives.

Release history
MATLAB is updated twice per year. In addition to new features and other improvements, each release has new bug fixes and smaller changes.

The number (or release number) is the version reported by Concurrent License Manager program FLEXlm. For a complete list of changes of both MATLAB and official toolboxes, consult the MATLAB release notes.

See also 
 Comparison of numerical-analysis software
 List of numerical-analysis software

Notes

Further reading

External links 

 
 

Array programming languages
Articles with example MATLAB/Octave code
C (programming language) software
Computer algebra system software for Linux
Computer algebra system software for macOS
Computer algebra system software for Windows
Computer algebra systems
Computer vision software
Cross-platform software
Data mining and machine learning software
Data visualization software
Data-centric programming languages
Dynamically typed programming languages
Econometrics software
High-level programming languages
IRIX software
Linear algebra
Mathematical optimization software
Numerical analysis software for Linux
Numerical analysis software for macOS
Numerical analysis software for Windows
Numerical linear algebra
Numerical programming languages
Numerical software
Parallel computing
Plotting software
Proprietary commercial software for Linux
Proprietary cross-platform software
Regression and curve fitting software
Software modeling language
Statistical programming languages
Time series software
Domain-specific programming languages